Barnstorming is an Atari 2600 video game designed by Steve Cartwright and published by Activision in 1982. It was the first game designed by Cartwright.  The idea for Barnstorming came to him as he watched a biplane one day while driving home from work.

Gameplay

The player must pilot a biplane through a series of barns in the shortest time possible while dodging windmills, weather vanes, and geese. Bumping into anything slows down the plane for a couple of seconds, increasing the overall time.

There are four levels of play determined by the game select switch. Game 1 is Hedge Hopper (10 barns), game 2 is Crop Duster (15 barns), game 3 is Stunt Pilot (15 barns), and game 4 is Flying Ace (25 barns). In the first three games, the course layout of barns, windmills, and even geese do not change, making it easy to memorize the layout. Game 4 is the only game with a random course.

Originally, a player with a time or better of 33.3 seconds on game 1, 51.0 seconds on game 2, or 54.0 seconds on game 3 could send Activision a picture of their screen and receive membership in the Activision Flying Aces and a Flying Aces patch.

Reception
Richard A. Edwards reviewed Barnstorming in The Space Gamer No. 54. Edwards commented that "This is a game no Atari VCS owner should be without.  Buy it."

Reviews
Tilt (Nov, 1982)

See also

List of Atari 2600 games
List of Activision games: 1980–1999

References

External links
Barnstorming at Atari Mania
Barnstorming at AtariAge

1982 video games
Activision games
Air racing video games
Atari 2600 games
Atari 2600-only games
North America-exclusive video games
Video games designed by Steve Cartwright
Video games developed in the United States